Dick Dowling is a 1905 marble sculpture of Confederate commander Richard W. Dowling by Frank Teich, previously installed in 1958 at the Cambridge Street entrance into Houston's Hermann Park, in the U.S. state of Texas.

In June 2020, the memorial was removed in response to the George Floyd protests.

History
The monument was publicly funded. Prior to 1958 the statue was at the city hall.

This was the first public monument commissioned by the city government; he was chosen as he fought in favor of the CSA.

The site received a Historical Marker (#11938) by the Texas Historical Commission in 1998.

On August 19, 2017, Andrew Schneck was arrested at the statue with bomb materials.

See also

 1905 in art
 List of monuments and memorials removed during the George Floyd protests
 List of public art in Houston

References

1905 establishments in Texas
1905 sculptures
Monuments and memorials in the United States removed during the George Floyd protests
Confederate States of America monuments and memorials in Texas
Hermann Park
Marble sculptures in Texas
Outdoor sculptures in Houston
Relocated buildings and structures in Texas
Sculptures of men in Texas
Statues in Houston
Statues removed in 2020